Basil Brooke may refer to:

Basil Brooke (Leicestershire MP) (died 1612), English MP for Leicestershire, 1607
Basil Brooke (metallurgist) (1576–1646), English ironmaster and metallurgist
Basil Brooke (Royal Navy officer, born 1882) (1882–1929), Royal Navy officer
Basil Brooke, 1st Viscount Brookeborough (1888–1973), former Prime Minister of Northern Ireland
Basil Brooke (Royal Navy officer, born 1895) (1895–1983), Royal Navy admiral and English cricketer